Hercules and the Treasure of the Incas is a 1964 film written and directed by Piero Pierotti  and starring  Alan Steel. Originally conceived as a peplum film, given the contemporary success of A Fistful of Dollars, it was turned into a western film during the shootings, resulting in a bizarre crossover between the two genres.

Plot

Cast 

  Alan Steel as William Smith / Hercules
 Toni Sailer as  Alan Fox 
 Wolfgang Lukschy as  El Puma 
  Brigitte Heiberg as Jenny Nixon 
 Mario Petri as  Jerry Darmon 
 Anna Maria Polani as  Queen Mysia 
 Pierre Cressoy as  Vince 
 Federico Boido as  Tex  
  Elisabetta Fanti as  Urpia 
 Dada Gallotti as Ilona 
  Omero Gargano as  Bartender
  Antonio Gradoli as  Castoro 
  Franco Jamonte as  Darmon's Accomplice 
  Gino Marturano as  Barracuda 
 Harry Riebauer as  Sheriff  
 Bruno Scipioni as  Darmon Henchman 
  Andrea Scotti as Stagecoach Traveller 
  Attilio Severini as  Grizzly 
 Umberto Spadaro as  Darmon Henchman 
 Carlo Tamberlani as  Burt Nixon 
  Gilberto Galimberti as  Aztec  
  Amedeo Trilli as  Barber 
 Nino Vingelli as  Indian

Release
Hercules and the Treasure of the Incas was released on 15 October 1964. In Italy, the film had a 110-minute running time while in the United States it was edited to 90 minutes.

See also
 List of Italian films of 1964

References

Bibliography

External links
 

1964 films
Italian Western (genre) films
Films directed by Piero Pierotti
Peplum films
Spaghetti Western films
Italian crossover films
1964 Western (genre) films
Sword and sandal films
French crossover films
Western (genre) crossover films
1960s Italian films
1960s French films